William Smith (10 November 1868 – 28 September 1907) was an English footballer who played in the Football League for Lincoln City, Loughborough, Notts County and Nottingham Forest.

He was named as a reserve for England's annual match against Scotland in 1891, and scored four goals in an unofficial international match against a touring 'Canada' team (which actually included several American players) later that year; however, he never received a full cap for his country.

References

1868 births
1907 deaths
English footballers
Long Eaton Rangers F.C. players
Notts County F.C. players
Nottingham Forest F.C. players
Loughborough F.C. players
Lincoln City F.C. players
Burton Swifts F.C. players
English Football League players
Football Alliance players
Association football wing halves
Association football forwards
People from Sawley, Derbyshire
Footballers from Derbyshire